Puan is a genus of South American goblin spiders first described by M. A. Izquierdo, N. Ferretti & G. Pompozzi in 2012.  it contains only two species.

References

Araneomorphae genera
Oonopidae